Dalianbei (Dalian North) railway station is a railway station of the Harbin–Dalian section of the Beijing–Harbin High-Speed Railway. It is  located in Dalian, in the Liaoning province of China. Construction of the station started on April 1, 2010 and the station opened to regular rail traffic in late 2012. On December 1, 2012, the station started to receive high-speed rail traffic as part of the newly opened Harbin–Dalian High-Speed Railway.

The station cost 1.54 billion yuan to construct. The main building contains  of space. There is a  weather shed. Ten platforms of some  serve twenty rail lines and can accommodate a maximum of 7,500 passengers. Passengers are transported around the station using 56 escalators, 26 elevators and two bridge approaches.

See also

 Beijing–Harbin High-Speed Railway
 Harbin–Dalian High-Speed Railway
 Panjin–Yingkou High-Speed Railway
 Chinese Eastern Railway
 South Manchuria Railway
 South Manchuria Railway Zone
 Changchun Light Rail Transit

References

Rail transport in Dalian
Railway stations in Liaoning
Railway stations in Dalian
Railway stations in China opened in 2012